Rambling Rose  may refer to:

Roses
Garden roses#Climbing and rambling, rambling types of the rose flowering plant
Rosa multiflora, sometimes known as rambler rose

Music
"Rambling Rose" (1948 song), by Joe Burke, lyrics by Joseph McCarthy, recorded by Perry Como and others 
"Ramblin' Rose", a 1962 song written by Noel and Joe Sherman, popularized by Nat King Cole
Ramblin' Rose (album) by Nat King Cole, 1962
"Ramblin' Rose", a song by Marijohn Wilkin, Fred Burch, and Obey Wilson, recorded by Jerry Lee Lewis and others

Other uses
Ramblin' Rose, a fishing vessel featured on Deadliest Catch documentary
Rambling Rose (novel), a 1972 novel by Calder Willingham
Rambling Rose (film), a 1991 drama film based on the novel